Watch Mr. Wizard was an American television program for children that demonstrates the science behind ordinary things. The show's creator and on-air host was Don Herbert. Author Marcel LaFollette says of the program, "It enjoyed consistent praise, awards, and high ratings throughout its history. At its peak, Watch Mr. Wizard drew audiences in the millions, but its impact was far wider. By 1956, it had prompted the establishment of more than five thousand Mr. Wizard science clubs, with an estimated membership greater than one hundred thousand."

It was briefly revived in 1971, and a third version of the show ran during the 1980s on the children's cable television network Nickelodeon as Mr. Wizard's World.

1951–1965: Original series

Watch Mr. Wizard first aired on NBC on March 3, 1951, with Don Herbert as the title character. In the weekly half-hour live television show, Herbert played a science hobbyist and every Saturday morning a neighbor would come to visit. The children were played by child actors; one of them (Rita McLaughlin) enjoyed a long subsequent acting career. Mr. Wizard always had some kind of laboratory experiment going that taught something about science. The experiments, many of which seemed impossible at first glance, were usually simple enough to be re-created by viewers.

The show was very successful; by 1954 it was broadcast live by 14 stations, and by kinescope (a film made from the television monitor of the original live broadcast) by an additional 77. Mr. Wizard Science Clubs were started throughout North America, numbering 5000 by 1955 and 50,000 by 1965. The show moved from Chicago to New York on September 5, 1955, and had produced 547 live broadcasts by the time the show was canceled in 1965. The show was cited by the National Science Foundation and American Chemical Society for increasing interest in science and won a 1953 Peabody Award.

Thirty-two episodes of Watch Mr. Wizard were selected by Herbert and released on eight DVDs.

1971: Canadian-produced revival
The series was revived by NBC from September 11, 1971 through September 2, 1972 as Mr. Wizard, and aired 26 episodes produced in color in Ottawa, Ontario, at the studios of CTV outlet CJOH-TV. The series was legally considered Canadian content, despite the American origins of the series and its host. CBC Television carried these episodes within Canada.

1983–1989: 

Mr. Wizard's World, a faster-paced version of the show, was shown three times a week on Nickelodeon, the then-rising kids cable channel. Once again, the revival was produced in Canada (this time in Calgary). It produced 78 episodes from 1983 onwards, and continued to run thereafter as reruns. During its run on Nickelodeon, it was the channel's #3 rated show in 1983 (behind Livewire and You Can't Do That on Television). It was also famous for its Ask Mr. Wizard segment where Herbert answered questions sent in by viewers of all ages. Episodes of this version of the show were reaired in 2005-06 on the digital cable channel The Science Channel.

Herbert once said: "My time on this Earth is getting shorter and shorter each day, but no matter how old I get, and even when I am dead, Mr. Wizard's World will never die". It was canceled in 1990, though reruns continued on Nick at Nite until 1995 and often in early morning time slots right after Nick at Nite finished (usually as part of Cable in the Classroom) until August 2000. In 1994, Herbert developed another new series of 15-minute spots called Teacher to Teacher with Mr. Wizard. They highlighted individual elementary science teachers and their projects. The series was sponsored by the National Science Foundation.

Selected episodes of Mr. Wizard's World are available on DVD from Mr. Wizard Studios Inc. in ten single volumes featuring four episodes on each disk. Gift box-sets are also available. Five seasons of the show, 75 episodes of the 78 total were released on Amazon instant streaming. These episodes are also available through Vudu and can be streamed for free with ads or rented at a fee. Paramount Global, the parent company of Nickelodeon, has also added the series to its Pluto TV service.

Segments on Mr. Wizard's World included
 Everyday Magic
 Supermarket Science
 Oddity
 What's This?
 Quick Quiz
 How It Works
 Snapshot
 Safari
 New Frontiers
 Know Your Body
 Close-Ups
 Challenge

In popular culture
In the song "Walkin' on the Sun" by Smash Mouth, the lyric, "Mr. Wizard can't perform no godlike hocus-pocus" is included.
In the song "WhatCouldPossiblyGoWrong" by Bones, the opening to Mr. Wizard's World episode 24 is sampled.
Radio comedians Bob and Ray parodied the program with a series of sketches featuring the character "Mr. Science". 
In a scene from Brian De Palma’s film Dressed to Kill, when Peter Miller (Keith Gordon) begins describing how he created homemade pepper spray, Liz Blake (Nancy Allen) interrupts, saying, “Spare me the Mr. Wizard lecture.” 
In a scene from Herbert Ross' film The Secret of My Success, when Brantley Foster (Michael J. Fox) pointed out that trees produce oxygen, Vera Prescott (Margaret Whitton) retorted with, "Who are you, Mr. Wizard?"
Radio comedians Stevens & Grdnic parodied the program with the sketch "Mr. Wizard & Timmy" on their 1982 album Retail Comedy @ Wholesale Prices.
In one sketch in the 13th episode of the 36th season of Saturday Night Live, Mr. Wizard's World is parodied with Bill Hader in the title role.
In the TV series Beakman's World, two puppet penguins are named "Don" and "Herb" after Don Herbert.
In four episodes of The Big Bang Theory, the characters meet a retired TV scientist based on Mr. Wizard named Professor Proton (played by Bob Newhart).
In the novel The Calculating Stars by Mary Robinette Kowal, the main character, Dr. Elma York, makes several appearances on Watch Mr. Wizard. In the story, York knew Don Herbert when they were both in the military.
In the show NCIS, the episode "Model Behavior" (Season 3; Episode 11) Leroy Jethro Gibbs and Abby Sciuto discuss Bill Nye the Science Guy, and Gibbs asks if it is "like Mr. Wizard".
In the 1999 film The Matrix, Neo (Keanu Reeves) calls his operator Tank for an exit from the Matrix, saying, "Mr. Wizard, get me the hell out of here!"

See also
Beakman's World
Bill Nye the Science Guy

Notes

References

Further reading
"Watch Mr. Wizard: Still Crazy (for Science) After All These Years". Interview With Don Herbert. Education Digest. Ann Arbor: October 1994. Vol 60. Iss. 2: pp. 68–71.
  Interview of Don Herbert by Mark Weingarten.

External links
  Homepage of a business founded by Don Herbert that sells DVDs containing episodes of Herbert's several television programs. The website also provides some information regarding the programs and of Herbert's life.
 
 

1951 American television series debuts
1965 American television series endings
1971 American television series debuts
1972 American television series endings
1983 American television series debuts
1989 American television series endings
1950s American children's television series
1960s American children's television series
1970s American children's television series
1980s American children's television series
American children's education television series
Black-and-white American television shows
Chicago television shows
English-language television shows
NBC original programming
Peabody Award-winning television programs
Science education television series
Television shows filmed in New York City
Television shows filmed in Ottawa
Television shows filmed in Calgary